List of short film festivals by continent.

Asia

Australia and New Zealand

Europe

North America

South America

Online and/or Worldwide

References 

Short